Kai Tak Airport  was the international airport of Hong Kong from 1925 until 1998. Officially known as Hong Kong International Airport from 1954 to 6 July 1998, it is often referred to as Hong Kong International Airport, Kai Tak, or simply Kai Tak and Kai Tak International Airport, to distinguish it from its successor, Chek Lap Kok International Airport, built on reclaimed and levelled land around the islands of Chek Lap Kok and Lam Chau,  to the west.

Because of the geography of the area, by which water was on three sides of the runway, with Kowloon City's residential apartment complexes to the north-west and 2,000-plus ft (-plus) mountains to the north-east of the airport, aircraft could not fly over the mountains and quickly drop in for a final approach. Instead, aircraft had to fly above Victoria Harbour and Kowloon City, passing north of Mong Kok's Bishop Hill. After passing Bishop Hill, pilots would see Checkerboard Hill with a large red and white checkerboard pattern. Once the pattern was sighted and identified, aircraft made a low-altitude (sub-600 ft) 47-degree right-hand turn, ending with a short final approach and touchdown. For pilots, this airport was technically demanding, as the approach could not be flown by aircraft instruments, but had to be flown visually because of the right-hand turn required. The History Channel programme Most Extreme Airports ranked it as the sixth-most dangerous airport in the world.

The airport was home to Hong Kong's international carrier Cathay Pacific, as well as regional carrier Dragonair (since 2016 known as Cathay Dragon), freight airline Air Hong Kong and Hong Kong Airways. The airport was also home to the former RAF Kai Tak and the Hong Kong Aviation Club.

Geographic environment

Kai Tak was located on the eastern side of Kowloon Bay in Kowloon, Hong Kong. The area is surrounded by rugged mountains.

When Kai Tak closed, there was only one runway in use, numbered 13/31 and oriented southeast–northwest (134/314 degrees true, 136/316 degrees magnetic). The runway was made by reclaiming land from the harbour and was extended several times after its initial construction. Beforehand, in the period of 1945–1955 the airport used a different 13/31 alongside a crossing 07/25.

At the northern end of the runway at closure, buildings rose up to six stories just across a major multi-lane arterial road. The other three sides of the runway were surrounded by Victoria Harbour. The low-altitude turning manoeuvre before the shortened final approach was so close to these buildings that passengers could spot television sets in the apartments: "...as the plane banked sharply to the right for landing ... the people watching television in the nearby apartments seemed an unsettling arm's length away."

History

1925 to 1930s
The story of Kai Tak started in 1912 when two businessmen, Ho Kai and Au Tak, formed the Kai Tak Investment Company to reclaim land in Kowloon for development. The land was acquired by the government for use as an airfield after the business plan failed.

In 1924, Harry Abbott opened the Abbott School of Aviation on that piece of land. Soon, it became a small grass strip runway airport used by the RAF, and by several flying clubs which, over time grew to include the Hong Kong Flying Club, the Far East Flying Training School, and the Aero Club of Hong Kong; these exist today as an amalgamation known as the Hong Kong Aviation Club. In 1928, a concrete slipway was built for seaplanes that used the adjoining Kowloon Bay. The first control tower and hangar at Kai Tak were built in 1935. In 1936, the first domestic airline in Hong Kong was established.

World War II
Hong Kong fell into the hands of the Japanese on December 12 1941 during World War II. In 1942, the Japanese army expanded Kai Tak, using many Allied prisoner-of-war (POW) labourers, building two concrete runways, 13/31 and 07/25. Numerous POW diary entries exist recalling the gruelling work and long hours working on building Kai Tak. A 2001 Environmental Study recommended that a new memorial be erected for the Sung Wong Toi rock and other remnants of the Kowloon area before Kai Tak.

1945 to 1970s

From September 1945 to August 1946 the airport was a Royal Navy shore base, "HMS Nabcatcher", the name previously attached to a Mobile Naval Air Base for the Fleet Air Arm. On 1 April 1947, a Royal Naval Air Station, HMS Flycatcher, was commissioned there.

A plan to turn Kai Tak into a modern airport was released in 1954. Bristol Britannia 102s took over BOAC's London-Tokyo flights in summer 1957 and were the largest airliners scheduled to the old airport (Boeing Stratocruisers never flew there). In 1958 the new NW/SE  runway extending into Kowloon Bay was completed by land reclamation. The two old runways were removed with footprint used by apron and terminal building. The passenger terminal was completed in 1962. This extension was completed in June 1974, but the full length of the runway was not in use until 31 December 1975, as construction of the new Airport Tunnel had kept the northwestern end of the runway closed.

In 1955 Kai Tak Airport featured in the film The Night My Number Came Up.

An Instrument Guidance System (IGS) was installed in 1974 to aid landing on runway 13. Use of the airport under adverse conditions was greatly increased.

In the 1970s an aircraft crash called attention to the potential loss of life in the high-density residential developments around the airport, though there were no serious accidents.

Overcrowding in the 1980s and 1990s
The growth of Hong Kong also put a strain on the airport's capacity. Its usage was close to, and for some time exceeded, the designed capacity. The airport was designed to handle 24 million passengers per year, but in 1996, Kai Tak handled 29.5 million passengers, plus 1.56 million tonnes of freight, making it the third busiest airport in the world in terms of international passenger traffic, and busiest in terms of international cargo throughput. Moreover, clearance requirements for aircraft takeoffs and landings made it necessary to limit the height of buildings that could be built in Kowloon. While Kai Tak was initially located far away from residential areas, the expansion of both residential areas and the airport resulted in Kai Tak being close to residential areas. This caused serious noise and engine pollution for nearby residents and put height restrictions, which were removed after Kai Tak closed. A night curfew from 11:30 pm to 6:30 am in the early morning also hindered operations.

As a result, in the late 1980s, the Hong Kong Government began searching for alternative locations for a new airport in Hong Kong to replace the aging airport. After deliberating on a number of locations, including the south side of Hong Kong Island, the government decided to build the airport on the island of Chek Lap Kok off Lantau Island. The new airport is located far away from Hong Kong's main residential areas, conducive to minimising the dangers of a major crash and also reducing the nuisance of noise pollution. A huge number of resources were mobilised to build this new airport, part of the ten programmes in Hong Kong's Airport Core Programme.

The Regal Meridien Hong Kong Airport Hotel (now the Regal Oriental Hotel), linked to the passenger terminal by a footbridge spanning Prince Edward Road, opened on 19 July 1982. This was Hong Kong's first airport hotel, and comprised 380 rooms including 47 suites. The hotel still exists, but the footbridge (which was connected to the passenger terminal) has been demolished. It is one of the few remaining buildings related to Kai Tak Airport.

Closure and legacy of Kai Tak Airport
The new airport officially opened on 6 July 1998 to replace the functions of the Kai Tak Airport. All of the essential airport supplies and vehicles that were left in the old airport for operation (some of the non-essential ones had already been transported to the new airport) were transported to Chek Lap Kok in one early morning with a single massive move, with a police escort.

On 6 July 1998 at 01:28, after the last aircraft departed for Chek Lap Kok, Kai Tak was finally retired as an airport. The final flights were:

 The last arrival: Dragonair KA841 from Chongqing (Airbus A320-200) landed Runway 13 at 23:38 (11:38pm).
 The last scheduled commercial flight: Cathay Pacific CX251 to London–Heathrow (Boeing 747-400) took off from Runway 13 at 00:02 (12:02am).
 The last departure: Cathay Pacific CX3340 ferry flight to the new airport at Chek Lap Kok (Airbus A340-300) took off from Runway 13 at 01:05 (1:05am).

A ceremony celebrating the end of the airport was held inside the control tower after the last flight took off. Richard Siegel, then-director of civil aviation, gave a brief speech ending with the words "Goodbye Kai Tak, and thank you", before dimming the lights briefly and then turning them off.

After the last plane, a Cathay Pacific A340-300, took off from Kai Tak International Airport to the new Hong Kong International Airport at 01:28 HKT, Kai Tak was closed, transferring its ICAO and IATA airport codes to the replacement airport at Chek Lap Kok. 

The new airport at Chek Lap Kok opened at 06:00 (6:00am) on 6 July 1998 with the arrival of Cathay Pacific Flight 889 (nicknamed Polar 1) from New York. The first week of operations was disrupted by a sequence of IT failures based around software bugs in the Flight Information Display System. This in turn disrupted baggage handling and airbridge allocation. But by the end of the first week these challenges, and other teething problems, were largely resolved, the new airport was exceeding Kai Tak performance measures. The exception was the new airport's main air cargo terminal built and operated by HACTL as a franchisee. The terminal faced major difficulties in coming into operation on 6 July, such that it closed again on 7 July to enable the franchisee to implement a major recovery programme. The disruption this caused to air cargo operations at the new airport led the government to temporarily reactivate for a month Kai Tak's cargo terminal. During this period, the airport was given temporary ICAO code VHHX.

The Kai Tak passenger terminal later housed government offices, automobile dealerships and showrooms, a go-kart racecourse, a bowling alley, a snooker hall, a golf range and other recreational facilities. In the mid 2000s, the passenger terminal and hangars were demolished. Many aviation enthusiasts were upset at the demise of Kai Tak because of the unique runway 13 approach.

The Hong Kong stop of Celine Dion's Let's Talk About Love World Tour was held on the airport's tarmac on 25 January 1999.

Until its retirement in 2018, the name Kai Tak was one of the names used in the lists of tropical cyclone names in the northwest Pacific Ocean. Submitted by Hong Kong, it was used four times.

BMW also used to test its hydrogen cars on the former Kai Tak apron area.

Former airlines and destinations

Passenger

Cargo Destinations

Operations

Terminals and facilities
The Kai Tak airport consisted of a linear passenger terminal building with a car park attached at the rear. There were eight boarding gates attached to the terminal building.

A freight terminal was located on the south side of the east apron and diagonally from the passenger terminal building.

Due to the limited space, the fuel tank farm was located between the passenger terminal and HAECO maintenance facilities (hangar).

Companies based at Kai Tak

Several airlines were based at Kai Tak:

 Cathay Pacific, which operated a mixed Airbus, Boeing and some Lockheed all-widebody fleet of one hundred aircraft, providing scheduled services to the rest of Asia, Australia, New Zealand, the Middle East, Europe, South Africa and North America.
 Dragonair
 Air Hong Kong Limited
 Hong Kong Airways (Until Late 1950s when bought by Cathay Pacific)
British Asia Airways (Due to relations between PRC and ROC)

Other tenants included:

 Hong Kong Aviation Club
 Government Flying Service
 DFS Kai Tak Market
 Häagen-Dazs
 Tin Tin Airport Restaurant

Runway 13 approach

The landing approach for planes using runway 13 at Kai Tak was considered spectacular and was infamous, not just amongst aviation enthusiasts but amongst the general public as well. Flight sim charts, which are based on the real charts used on the airport, give an outline on the procedures used on approach into Kai Tak Airport.

Checkerboard approach
The Checkerboard approach (also spelled as Chequerboard approach) initially begins to the south-west of the airport, with aircraft flying westbound at a minimum altitude of 6000 feet. At this beginning stage of the approach, the aircraft should be passing above Cheung Chau – a small island just off Lantau Island. After that, the aircraft was required to proceed up to "Point Golf", which was on the south side of Lantau Island and directly south of the current Chek Lap Kok Airport. Approaching aircraft then had to make a right-hand U-turn in order to intercept the localiser for the Runway 13 IGS, which generally happened above the current Chek Lap Kok Airport site. The IGS was, in essence, a heavily modified Instrument landing system (ILS) system designed uniquely for Kai Tak Airport, otherwise functioning identical to a normal ILS. At roughly 2500 feet, the autopilot was disconnected, and the rest of the approach was flown manually. The aircraft then descended below 1000 feet and shortly afterwards reached Kowloon Tsai Park and its small hill (Checkerboard Hill). Upon reaching the small hill above Kowloon Tsai Park, which was painted with a large "aviation orange" and white checkerboard, used as a visual reference point on the final approach (in addition to the middle marker on the Instrument Guidance System), the pilot needed to make a 47° visual right turn to line up with the runway and complete the final leg. The aircraft would be just  from touchdown, at a height of less than  when the turn was made. That demanding manoeuvre became known in the aviation community as the "Hong Kong Turn" or the "Checkerboard Turn". For many airline passengers on planes approaching and landing on Runway 13 at Kai Tak Airport, it became referred to as the "Kai Tak Heart Attack", because they were often frightened to be turning at such a close proximity to the ground, which, at less than 150 ft, or 45 metres, was generally less than even the Boeing 767's wingspan, which is considered a medium-size airliner. The turn was so low that passengers could see television sets running in people's residences near the airport.

Handling the runway 13 approach was difficult enough with normal crosswinds because, even if the wind direction was constant, it was changing relative to the aircraft as the plane made the 47° visual right turn, meaning that what would be a headwind heading directly east on the IGS would become a crosswind and begin to push the aircraft over and off the runway alignment without correction. The landing would become even more challenging when crosswinds from the north-east were strong and gusty during typhoons. The mountain range north-east of the airport also made the wind vary greatly in both speed and direction. Watching large aircraft banking at low altitudes and taking big crab angles during their final approaches was popular with plane spotters. Despite the difficulty, the runway 13 approach was used most of the time due to the prevailing wind direction in Hong Kong.

Because of the turn required during final approach, ILS was not available for runway 13 and landings had to follow a visual approach. This made the approach unusable in low visibility conditions.

Stonecutters' Approach
Alongside the Chequerboard approach, there was a lesser known approach into Kai Tak that led aircraft over the Stonecutters' NDB at a heading of 040 and led into a ~90° turn to line up on Runway 13. This approach was used extremely infrequently, since the Chequerboard approach had a localiser and glide slope to work off of, and NDBs are very rarely used in commercial aviation today. It generally can be assumed this approach was used when the localiser and glide slope were offline for maintenance.

Runway 13 departure
Runway 13 was the preferred departure runway for heavy aircraft due to the clear departure path, opposite that of the runway 31 departure. Heavy aircraft on departure using runway 13 would often need nearly the entire length of the runway, particularly during summer days due to the air temperature.

Runway 31 approach
Runway 31 approaches and landings were similar to other airports in which ILS was available. Runways 13 and 31 are, in fact, the same physical runway, however if a flight is landing on Runway 13 that means that the aircraft is flying in on a south-easterly direction, while a flight landing on Runway 31 would be coming in a north-westerly direction. This applies for flights taking off on runways 13 and 31 – a flight departing from runway 13 would be heading south-east, and vice versa. This is because runways are named for their magnetic heading in decadegrees, which means that a runway oriented anywhere between 125° and 134° magnetic would be numbered 13, and vice versa. The path towards the runway passed within  to the north of Heng Fa Chuen on Hong Kong Island.

Runway 31 was also used for landing early in the morning for noise abatement.

Runway 31 departure
When lined up for takeoff on runway 31, a range of hills including  Beacon Hill would be right in front of the aircraft. The aircraft had to make a sharp 65-degree left turn soon after takeoff to avoid the hills (i.e. the reverse of a Runway 13 landing). If a runway change occurred due to wind change from runway 13 departures to runway 31 departures, planes that were loaded to maximum payload for runway 13 departures had to return to the terminal to offload some goods to provide enough climbing clearance over buildings during a runway 31 departure.

Private aviation

The Hong Kong Aviation Club formerly held most of its activities at Kai Tak, where it had hangars and other facilities.

The club moved most of its aircraft to Shek Kong Airfield in 1994 after the hours for general aviation at Kai Tak were sharply reduced, to two hours per morning, as of 1 July that year. Kai Tak closed to fixed-wing traffic in 1998. The club ended its helicopter activities at Kai Tak on 9 July 2017. The Kai Tak location, which it was able to use all days of the week, meant that helicopter training took less time compared to fixed-wing training, as usage at Shek Kong is restricted to weekends.

Incidents and accidents

Many planes crashed at Kai Tak due to poor weather and hard approaches:

 On 25 January 1947, a Philippine Air Lines DC-3 aircraft crashed into Mount Parker, killing four crew members.
 On 21 December 1948, a China National Aviation Corporation Douglas DC-4 struck Basalt Island after a descent through clouds. 35 were killed.
 On 24 February 1949, a Cathay Pacific Douglas DC-3 crashed into a hillside near Braemar Reservoir after aborting an approach in poor visibility and attempting to go around. All 23 on board were killed.
 On 11 March 1951, a Pacific Overseas Airlines Douglas DC-4 crashed after takeoff into the hills between Mount Butler and Mount Parker on Hong Kong Island. The captain of the aircraft allegedly failed to execute the turn left operation after departure. 24 were killed.
 On 9 April 1951, a Siamese Airways Douglas DC-3 lost control on its turn while attempting a night-time visual approach. The captain allegedly allowed the aircraft to lose speed while attempting to turn quickly. 16 were killed.
 On 19 April 1961, a US military Douglas DC-3 (C-47 Skytrain) bound for Formosa crashed into Mount Parker after takeoff. Of the 16 on board, 15 were killed.
 On 24 August 1965, a United States Marine Corps C-130 Hercules crashed shortly after takeoff from runway 13, killing 59 of the 71 people on board. This was the deadliest accident at Kai Tak.
 On 30 June 1967, a Thai Airways International Sud Aviation SE-210 Caravelle III crashed into Victoria Harbour while trying to land during a torrential rainstorm. A typhoon was some  NW of Hong Kong, but the colony was not closed down in preparation of the typhoon. The co-pilot, who was flying the aircraft and unable to see the runway due to the heavy rain, allegedly made an abrupt heading change, causing the aircraft to enter a high rate of descent and crash into the harbour to the right of the runway. The starboard wing snapped off on impact, and the aircraft rolled onto its starboard side, halving the number of escape routes. 24 were killed, but only 23 bodies were recovered at the scene. The final body was recovered after it was seen floating in the harbour six weeks later.
 On 2 September 1977, a Transmeridian Air Cargo Canadair CL-44 lost control and crashed into the Tathong Channel on fire shortly after takeoff. The no. 4 engine was said to have failed, causing an internal fire in the engine and the aircraft fuel system that eventually resulted in a massive external fire. Four were killed.
 On 9 March 1978, a China Airlines Flight 831 was hijacked. The hijacker (the flight engineer of the flight) demanded to be taken to Mainland China (the airline was of the Republic of China on Taiwan, not the People's Republic of China, which controlled the mainland). The hijack lasted less than a day, and the hijacker was killed.
On 7 February 1980, a China Airlines Boeing 747-200 B-1866 (later B-18255) had a tail-strike incident while landing at Kai Tak International Airport on route to Taipei from Stockholm Arlanda Airport via King Abdulaziz International Airport and Kai Tak. The aircraft was improperly repaired which caused it to break up in flight on 25 May 2002 while flying to Chek Lap Kok International Airport.
 On 18 October 1983, a Lufthansa Boeing 747 freighter abandoned takeoff after engine no. 2 malfunctioned, probably at speed exceeding V1 (the takeoff/abort decision point). The aircraft overran the runway onto soft ground and sustained severe damage. The three crew on board suffered only minor injuries.
 On 31 August 1988, the right outboard flap of a CAAC Airlines Hawker Siddeley Trident operating Flight 301 hit approach lights of runway 31 while landing under rain and fog. The right main landing gear then struck a lip and collapsed, causing the aircraft to run off the runway and slip into the harbour. 7 were killed.
 On 4 November 1993, a China Airlines Boeing 747-400, operating Flight 605, overran the runway while landing during a typhoon. The wind was gusting to gale force at the time. Despite the plane's unstable approach, the captain did not go around. It touched down more than 2/3 down the runway and was unable to stop before the runway ended. Although the aircraft ended up submerged beyond the end of the runway, there were only 23 minor injuries amongst the 396 passengers and crew. 
 On 23 September 1994, a Heavylift Cargo Airlines Lockheed L-100-30 Hercules lost control shortly after takeoff from runway 13. The pitch control system of one of its propellers was said to have failed. Six were killed.

Redevelopment

2002 blueprint
The new plans based on the feasibility studies were passed by the chief executive in July 2002.
There were plans for the site of Kai Tak to be used for housing development, which was once projected to house around 240,000–340,000 residents. Due to calls from the public to protect the harbour and participate more deeply in future town planning, the scale and plan of the project were yet to be decided. There were also plans for a railway station and maintenance centre in the proposed plan for the Sha Tin to Central Link.

There were also proposals to dredge the runway to form several islands for housing, to build a terminal capable of accommodating cruise ships the size of Queen Mary 2, and more recently, to house the Hong Kong Sports Institute, as well as several stadiums, in the case that the institute was forced to move so that the equestrian events of the 2008 Summer Olympics could be held at its present site in Sha Tin.

On 9 January 2004, the Court of Final Appeal ruled that no reclamation plan for Victoria Harbour could be introduced unless it passed an "overriding public interest" test. Subsequently, the Government abandoned these plans.

Kai Tak Planning Review
The Government set up a "Kai Tak Planning Review" in July 2004 for further public consultation. A number of plans were presented.

June 2006 blueprint
A new plan for the redevelopment of Kai Tak was issued by the government in June 2006. Under these proposals, hotels would be scattered throughout the  site, and flats aimed at housing 86,000 new residents were proposed.

Other features of the plan included two cruise terminals and a large stadium.

October 2006 blueprint
The Planning Department unveiled a major reworking of its plans for the old Kai Tak airport site on 17 October 2006, containing "a basket of small measures designed to answer a bevy of concerns raised by the public". The revised blueprint will also extend several "green corridors" from the main central park into the surrounding neighbourhoods of Kowloon City, Kowloon Bay and Ma Tau Kok.

The following features are proposed in the revised plan:

 two cruise terminals, with a third terminal to be added if the need arises
 a luxury hotel complex near the cruise terminals—the complex would sit about seven stories high, with hotel rooms atop commercial or tourist-related spaces
 an eight-station monorail linking the tourist hub with Kwun Tong
 a large stadium
 a central park to provide green space
 a new bridge, likely to involve further reclamation of Victoria Harbour

The following are major changes:

 hotel spaces are to be centralised near the end of the runway, and will face into the harbour towards Central
 a third cruise terminal could be added at the foot of the hotel cluster if the need arises
 a second row of luxury residential spaces is to be added facing Kwun Tong, built on an elevated terrace or platform to preserve a view of the harbour

The government has promised that:

 the total amount of housing and hotel space will remain the same as proposed in June 2006
 plot ratios will be the same as before
 the total commercial space on the site will also remain about the same

The new bridge proposed by the government, joining the planned hotel district at the end of the runway with Kwun Tong, could be a potential source of controversy. Under the Protection of the Harbour Ordinance, no harbour reclamation can take place unless the Government can demonstrate to the courts an "overriding public need".

The new Kai Tak blueprint was presented to the Legislative Council on 24 October 2006 after review by the Town Planning Board.

2011 onwards
In 2011, with most of the former Kai Tak area still abandoned, ideas were floated to develop the area for commercial property, citing shortages of office space and rising property costs. In June 2013, the Kai Tak Cruise Terminal was opened on the tip of the former runway. Two public housing estates opened on the northeast area of the site in 2013, providing over 13,000 new rental flats. As of 2018, the public estates have been joined by some private residential developments, now nearing completion.

A small park and new hospital (Hong Kong Children's Hospital) have also opened.

A new Mass Transit Railway (MTR) station, Kai Tak, opened on the former airport land in early 2020. Another station, Sung Wong Toi, was opened in June 2021.

Construction of the Kai Tak Sports Park on the former airport land has also commenced in April 2019. Once completed, Kai Tak Sports Park will be the largest sports venue in Hong Kong and will include a 50,000 seat Main Stadium, an Indoor Sports Center, a Public Sports Ground and multiple open spaces.

Kai Tak Sky Garden, a massive elevated garden, opened in May 2021. It occupies part of the former runway and apron.

See also

 Kai Tak Sports Park
 List of buildings and structures in Hong Kong
 List of defunct international airports
 Lung Tsun Stone Bridge

References

External links

 "Airport Kai Tak Airport 1925-1998." Hong Kong Civil Aviation Department
 Archives of the Kai Tak webpage at Hong Kong Civil Aviation Department (during the airport's operation)
 Kai Tak Development – official site
 Pictures from Kai Tak: Airliners.net – Jetphotos.net
 Historic photographs of Kai Tak.
 An account by a Kai Tak Air Traffic Controller – Phil Parker

Defunct airports in China
Defunct airports in the United Kingdom
Airports established in 1925
Airports disestablished in 1998
1925 establishments in Hong Kong
1925 establishments in the United Kingdom
1998 disestablishments in Hong Kong
1998 disestablishments in China
Airports in Hong Kong
Former buildings and structures in Hong Kong
Kowloon Bay
Kowloon City District
Victoria Harbour